The Willakenzie Grange Hall is a historic community meeting hall in Eugene, Oregon, United States.

The grange hall was listed on the National Register of Historic Places in 2009.

See also
National Register of Historic Places listings in Lane County, Oregon

References

Grange organizations and buildings in Oregon
Buildings and structures in Eugene, Oregon
National Register of Historic Places in Eugene, Oregon
1913 establishments in Oregon
Grange buildings on the National Register of Historic Places